The New Zealand Women's Political Party was a feminist political party in New Zealand that is now defunct. It was founded in 1981, with the goal of standing candidates in every electorate and advocating for women's issues. The 1984 snap general election, held with only a month's notice, was unexpected for the party.

The party only won 442 votes (0.02%), winning 253 votes (1.26%) in Auckland Central, 100 votes (0.49%) in Kaipara, and 89 votes (0.40%) in Tamaki.

In an interview of the party's candidates with feminist magazine Broadsheet after the 1984 election, Sandi Hall told Helen Watson that the party operated from feminist principles. In regards to other policies, Hall said that the party viewed ANZUS as a "military protection pact", which they would discard, and instead turn New Zealand into a global mediator of disputes between countries. In the same interview, Christine Corker, when asked if the party had any effect on the victorious Labour Party's policies, said that her Kaipara candidacy had an effect on the rhetoric of other candidates in the seat, saying that the Labour candidate held an event on women's issues, and the NZ Party candidate took out local ads directed at women.

The party did not contest the 1987 election or any future election, and is currently defunct.

References

Defunct political parties in New Zealand
Feminist parties